Tiny Tank (marketed as Tiny Tank: Up Your Arsenal) is a third-person shooter platform game developed by AndNow and Appaloosa Interactive. Initially meant to be published by MGM Interactive in late 1998, they dropped the title and gave it to Sony Computer Entertainment America. It was released in 1999 for the PlayStation.

Gameplay
The player controls Tiny as he traverses many levels, eliminating SenTrax forces as he goes. There are two bars at the top of the screen that show Tiny's health and the amount of nanometal acquired. Nanometal is essential for the on-board Fix-It Crabs to repair Tiny. If the nanometal meter runs out, health cannot be regenerated. There is also a map on the upper right hand corner identifying the surroundings, enemies, and mission objectives.

Tiny can pick up fallen parts from destroyed enemies:
Positronic Brains (P-Brains) - A robot's artificial intelligence system. Can be used to improve and upgrade equipped weapons.
Weapons - Fallen weapons can be attached to Tiny's four weapon hardpoints.
Debris (Nanometal) - Essential for the on-board Fix-It Crabs to repair Tiny.
There are also other upgrades that are placed around the levels themselves that can be acquired:
Invulnerability - Temporary invulnerability.
Nanometal - Essential for the on-board Fix-It Crabs to repair Tiny, but these possess much more material than enemy debris does. Appears as a gray rectangular container.

Tiny also has deployable "Teeny Weeny Tanks", even smaller versions of himself that can be manually controlled or set to hunt enemies, gather upgrades, or protect Tiny.

Plot

The game's plot takes place in sometime before 2098 A.D., all of Earth's armed forces were disintegrated into one large corporation, SenTrax. SenTrax vowed to create a robot army to fight humanity's wars, so mankind itself would not have to. However, they needed the peoples' vote to set this plan into motion, and thus developed the titular "Tiny Tank" - a small yellow tank with an occasionally unfriendly attitude. The creation of this cute killing machine made SenTrax's popularity skyrocket, and won them the vote. As thanks, the corporation set up an exhibition showing their yellow mascot fighting off the entire SenTrax army on July 4, 2098, broadcast live over the Internet. However, when the rehearsal began, one of the SenTrax robots had been accidentally fitted with live ammunition and destroyed Tiny with one shot. As a result, Tiny's "positronic brain" (his artificial intelligence system) shattered, and its shards gave "life" to the entire robot army. The robot that had fired the shot, now self-aware and calling himself Mutank, took control of the rampant robots and began to eliminate humanity so that machines could thrive. Humanity was forced to evacuate into underground asteroid shelters as the mechanical army conquered the surface.

But then on July 4, 2198 A.D., which was 100 years later, Tiny Tank was finally restored by automated SenTrax Fix-It Crabs, which were minuscule robots made to repair damaged machinery. Also as a result, a female artificial intelligence on board an orbital satellite reawakened Tiny, sent him to fight Mutank's robot army and save mankind once again, and gave him his mission briefing for his spying assignments to thwart the criminal conspiracy Mutank and his hitmen have started.

Development
The game was in development as early as April 1998.

Reception

Many magazines gave early positive reviews while the game was still in development before Sony stepped in. Next Generation, for example, said that the game "succeeds in what it sets out to accomplish, both [in] its humor and its gameplay." After release, however, reviews were mixed.

References

External links
 

1999 video games
PlayStation (console) games
PlayStation (console)-only games
Sony Interactive Entertainment games
MGM Interactive games
3D platform games
Tank simulation video games
Third-person shooters
Science fiction video games
Video games about mecha
Post-apocalyptic video games
Vehicular combat games
Video games developed in Hungary